Therese Concordia Maron (née Mengs; 1725 – October 10, 1806), was a German (Saxon) painter, for most of her life active in Rome. She was the elder sister of more known painter Anton Raphael Mengs.  

Therese was born in northern Bohemian town of Ústí nad Labem into the Lutheran family of Danish painter Ismael Mengs, a hofmaler (court painter) at the court of Saxon-Polish electors and kings. Her birth in Bohemia was mere coincidence, because her father maintained an extramarital relationship with his housekeeper Charlotte Bormann and in an effort to conceal the birth of an illegitimate child, he decided to take the mistress under the pretext of "vacations" to the nearest bigger town abroad, namely to Ústí nad Labem (90 km upstream of the Elbe River), where she gave birth to daughter Therese Concordia. After a few weeks, Mengs took his daughter and her mother back to Dresden, the Saxon capital, where they lived. (Three years later he made the same trick even with the birth of his son, Anton Raphael). 

In her 16 years she moved with her family to Rome, where married later (1765) an Austrian portrait painter and pupil of her brother, Anton von Maron. She painted a number of enamels, pastels, and miniatures, including a self-portrait and a portrait of her younger sister Julia. She died in Rome in 1806.

Gallery

See also
 List of German women artists

Notes

References

 

1725 births
1806 deaths
German people of Danish descent
18th-century German women artists
19th-century German women artists
Sibling artists
Women enamellers
German enamellers
18th-century enamellers
19th-century enamellers
German women painters
18th-century German painters
19th-century German painters
Artists from Ústí nad Labem
Artists from Dresden
German emigrants to Italy
Artists from Rome